Steven Watson (born 1947) is an author, art and cultural historian, curator, and documentary filmmaker.

His 1991 book Strange Bedfellows: The First American Avant-Garde was called "a chapter in our national biography" by Stefan Kanfer for the Los Angeles Times and "a marvelous group portrait of a band of cultural renegades" by Publishers Weekly. Watson has written five books about 20th century American avant-garde and counterculture movements, curated two exhibitions at the National Portrait Gallery ("Group Portrait, The First American Avant-Garde" and "Rebels: Painters and Poets of the 1950's"), and served as consultant curator for the Whitney Museum exhibition "Beat Culture and the New America".

Biography
Watson was born in 1947. He grew up in the suburbs of Minneapolis, Minnesota and graduated from Mound High School. He majored in English at Stanford University and participated in anti-Vietnam War protests, including a guerrilla theater piece called Alice in ROTC-Land, co-starring with Sigourney Weaver. After graduation, he founded an alternative elementary school called KNOW School in Auburn, California. He studied psychology at the University of California, Santa Barbara, where he received his Ph.D. in 1976, and he worked for nineteen years as the staff psychologist of the Putnam County Community Mental Health Clinic. In 1976, Watson also began writing articles for the Village Voice, New York Newsday, Soho Weekly News, and Gaysweek. His work on gay culture included the first major article about Marsha P. Johnson, an early extended interview with Sylvia Rivera, and a book about the transgender figure, Minette. At the same time, he began writing books about key circles of the twentieth century. He currently lives in New York City.

Published works 
Books:

 Minette: Recollections of a Part-time Lady (with Ray Dobbins) (1979)
 Stonewall Romances (with Ray Dobbins) (1979)
 Strange Bedfellows: The First American Avant-Garde (1991)
 The Harlem Renaissance: Hub of African American Culture 1920-1930 (1995)
 The Birth of the Beat Generation: Visionaries Rebels and Hipsters 1944-1960 (1995)
 Prepare for Saints: Gertrude Stein, Virgil Thomson, and the Mainstreaming of American Modernism (2000)
 An Eye of the Twentieth Century: Selected Letters of Henry McBride (edited with Catherine Morris) (2001)
 Factory Made: Warhol and the Sixties (2003)

Films:

 Prepare for Saints: The Making of a Modern Opera, documentary, for Connecticut Public Television (writer, director).
 Beatrice Wood Remembers, short documentary, (2019) (writer, director).

Collaborations

Artifacts at the End of a Decade 
Artifacts at the End of a Decade, organized by Steven Watson and Carol Huebner Venezia, is a boxed multiple that contains the work of 44 artists. Conceived in 1979 and published in 1981, it includes works by Sol Lewitt, Laurie Anderson, Robert Wilson, R. Crumb, Lucinda Childs, Futura 2000 and other graffiti artists, John Ashbery, Betsey Johnson, Robert Kushner, Martha Rosler, and others. Upon its publication, art critic John Perreault wrote that "the work is an anthology of sorts, but it is also an object in its own right. It can be compared to artists books, print portfolios, multimedia multiples, etc. In truth, however, there is little to compare Artifacts within the realm of art.” 

Artifacts is currently in the collections of the Museum of Modern Art, the Metropolitan Museum of Art, the Centre Pompidou, the Tate Modern, the Victoria and Albert Museum, the Hamburger Bahnhof, and the Whitney Museum of American Art, among others.

Artifacts was exhibited at the Centre Pompidou in the summer of 2022, following its acquisition by the Bibliothèque Kandinsky.

References 

1947 births
Living people
American documentary film directors
Historians from Minnesota
21st-century American historians
Writers from New York City
20th-century American historians
Writers from Minneapolis
American literary historians
Historians from New York (state)
Film directors from Minnesota
Film directors from New York City